The Panasonic Lumix DMC-FZ1000 is a digital superzoom bridge camera by Panasonic. It went on sale in June 2014. It has a 20 megapixel 3:2 BSI-CMOS sensor and Leica-branded 25–400 mm equivalent focal length lens with a maximum aperture of 2.8 to 4 (4 at about 170 mm and higher). It has a 1-inch CMOS sensor and supports ISO film speeds from 80 to 25600, shutter speeds from 1/16000 s (electronic shutter) to 60 s and RAW capture, while the lowest physical shutter speed is 1/4000 s. The unit is equipped with five "Fn" function buttons which can be allocated to custom shortcuts.

It is actually the world's first bridge camera which can record in 4K (2160p) video resolution, as opposed to other compact cameras filming at full HD (1080p) resolution. What sets it apart the most is the introduction of 4K at 30p Ultra HD video with a price lower than $900. Furthermore, 8 megapixel JPEG photos can be extracted from any video frame from 4K videos in playback mode.

Along with its main competitor, the 2013 Sony Cyber-shot DSC-RX10, it is part of a new class of superzoom cameras that use larger sensors, better displays and electronic viewfinders. They easily provide much narrower depth of field when desired, compared to previous more compact superzoom/ultrazoom cameras. Out of the two, the FZ1000 has a much larger zoom range (16×); the exact video mode and whether OIS is used determines the crop factor, here expressed as 35 mm equivalent focal length for the inbuilt lens:

While the RX10 has a macro focus spot of 5 cm, the FZ1000 is able to record clear-focused photos and videos. The optical zoom is also usable while recording videos in any video recording mode, including the highest resolution with 3840 × 2160 pixels. It is possible to record HDR-photos, but no HDR-videoclips.

Canon PowerShot G3 X is the newest competitor in 1" sensor large zoom camera, relatively small, but has longest 25× zoom and touch screen with capability to focus when shooting, however has no eye viewfinder and no capability to shoot in 4K.

The FZ1000 was first succeeded by the Panasonic Lumix DMC-FZ2500 in November, 2016. However, Panasonic afterwards also released the FZ1000 II in March, 2019. The FZ1000 was discontinued in the spring of 2021.

Focal Length 
 25 – 400 mm in 35 mm equiv. in 3:2 for stills (Full Sensor and Full Zooming Range) 
 26 – 416 mm in 35 mm equiv. in 16:9 for stills
 26 – 416 mm in 35 mm equiv. in 16:9 video recording, O.I.S. Off
 28 – 448 mm in 35 mm equiv. in 16:9 video recording, O.I.S. On
 37 – 592 mm in 35 mm equiv. in 4K video recording (using the center of the sensor with 3840 × 2160 pixels.)

Optical image stabilization 
The FZ1000 is equipped with a 5-axis optical image stabilization. However, it is deactivated during 2160p video recording.

Burst Shot 

The FZ1000's burstshot mode can record up to 12 JPEG pictures per second with full resolution at highest selected burst speed. There are four different burst speeds to choose from. The second-highest speed does permanently record photos, but if the burst memory is full and the memory card cannot keep up, it will slow down automatically.

High-speed video 

Prior to official release, the Lumix FZ1000 was originally announced as being able to record slow-motion in the following resolutions and framerates: 
 Full HD 1920×1080: 100 or 120 fps
 HD 720p 1280×720: 200 or 240 fps
 640×360: 300 or 360 fps

But the firmware currently only allows to record FullHD at 120 fps.

Another caveat to be aware of is that the device records slow motion (“high speed”) videos using the menial method, i.e. the output of Slow-Motion recording is not saved as being the original duration but is instead "stretched": for example, a one-second recording at 120 fps will be saved as being 4 seconds at 30 fps. While this is easily corrected for the video track without the need for reencoding, one consequence is that audio is not recorded.

Zoom Levels 

 25 mm – 2.8
 200 mm – 4.0
 400 mm  – 4.0

The FZ1000 also has a feature for Lossless Digital Zooming, which is interpreted as iƵoom, and will be used, if the highest image resolution is not selected. This is also available for Videos up to FullHD-Resolution.

V-Lux 

Leica's V-Lux-Technology (Typ 114) is based on this camera, with differences in warranty, bundled software, and price.

In their review of the FZ1000, DPReview wrote, "The FZ1000 has an advantage over ILCs, as any lens you add to one of those cameras will be larger, heavier and pricier", and gave it a Gold Award. While cameras.reviewed.com wrote: It is better than 100% of the point & shoot cameras we have tested under $900.

Light sensitivity 
According to test images from a Polish review, the level of detail remains high until ISO 6400 and acceptable at ISO 12800. The level of detail plunges at peak ISO 25600.

References

External links

Bridge digital cameras
FZ1000
Superzoom cameras
Audiovisual introductions in 2014
Digital cameras with CMOS image sensor